Tishkino is a rural locality (a village) in Zabolotskoye Rural Settlement, Permsky District, Perm Krai, Russia. The population was 17 as of 2010. There are 2 streets.

Geography 
Tishkino is located 38 km southwest of Perm (the district's administrative centre) by road. Aleksiki is the nearest rural locality.

References 

Rural localities in Permsky District